Andrews v Law Society of British Columbia, [1989] 1 SCR 143 is the first Supreme Court of Canada case to deal with section 15 (equality rights) of the Canadian Charter of Rights and Freedoms. The court outlined a test, sometimes called the "Andrews test", to determine whether there has been a prima facie violation of equality rights. Andrews further held that discrimination according to grounds analogous to those enumerated in section 15 could result in a violation of the Charter.

History 
Andrews, a British subject and a permanent resident in Canada, met all the requirements for admission to the provincial bar with the exception he was not a Canadian citizen. Andrews brought a motion to strike down the requirement for citizenship on the grounds it violated section 15 of the Charter.

At trial, Supreme Court of British Columbia held in favour of the Law Society. On appeal to the British Columbia Court of Appeal, the ruling was overturned. Joseph Arvay argued the case for the Attorney General of British Columbia.

Judgment 
The problem put to the court was whether the requirement of Canadian citizenship for admission to the British Columbia bar is an infringement upon or denial of the equality rights guaranteed by section 15(1) of the Charter, and if so, whether it is justified under section 1.

The majority of the court held that section 42 of Barristers and Solicitors Act violated section 15 and it could not be saved under section 1. The majority was written by Wilson J with Dickson CJ and L'Heureux-Dubé J concurring. In dissent, McIntyre and Lamer JJ disagreed on the point of the section 1 analysis, believing it would be upheld on the basis of "reasonable limit" and preferred to be deferential to the House of Commons. La Forest J wrote a separate decision. However, all three decisions adopted the section 15 analysis used by McIntyre J.

The test set out by McIntyre J and adopted by the majority held that claims under section 15 would be assessed based on:
 Actual differential treatment,
 Based on one of the enumerated prohibited grounds in s 15 or one that is analogous to those grounds,
 Which is discriminatory because of an imposed burden or denied benefit.

Reasoning 
The court first defined a general approach to the equality guarantee. The court stated that the section is not a general guarantee of equality, rather it is only concerned with equal application of the law. It was further stated that it should be recognized that not all differences in treatment will result in inequality and that identical treatment may result in inequality.

As such, the suggestion to apply the same legal rules to groups or individuals who are "similarly situated" ("similarly situated test" where likes are treated alike and dislikes differently) was firmly rejected. Bliss v Canada (AG), a pre-Charter Supreme Court case where a pregnant woman was denied employment benefits, was considered as an example of the problems with such an approach.

Instead the court concentrated on the prohibition on discrimination.

. . . discrimination may be escribed as a distinction, whether intentional or not but based on grounds relating to the personal characteristics of the individual or group which has the effect of imposing burdens, obligations, or disadvantages on such individual or group not imposed on others, or which withholds or limits access to opportunities, benefits, and advantages available to other members of society. Distinctions based on personal characteristics attributed to an individual solely on the basis of association with a group will rarely escape the charge of discrimination, while those based on an individual's merits and capacities will rarely be so classified. (p. 280)

The court states the discrimination must be based on an "enumerated or analogous grounds", and the individual seeking to strike down a law must demonstrate the existence of differential treatment based on either of the two grounds. From there the onus shifts to the Crown who must show the law justified under s. 1.

The majority found that the citizenship requirement was not strongly linked to a person's capabilities to practice law, and so found it in violation of section 1.

Legacy 
Andrews was the leading case during the first decade of section 15 jurisprudence. By holding the phrase "in particular" in section 15 made the listed grounds non-exhaustive and recognizing citizenship as an analogous ground, the Court opened the door to include other historically marginalized groups that were not explicitly protected under that section such as members of Canada's LGBT community.

In the 1999 case Law v Canada (Minister of Employment and Immigration), the Supreme Court tightened the Andrews test, limiting burdensome differences in treatment to those that a reasonable person would say violated the claimant's dignity as a human being. This position was reversed by the Supreme Court in the 2008 case R v Kapp, back to the original test, but re-adjusted in Quebec (AG) v A in 2013 and again by Kahkewistahaw First Nation v Taypotat in 2015. However, much of the Andrews approach remained the same through these cases.

References

External links 
 

Supreme Court of Canada cases
Section Fifteen Charter case law
1989 in Canadian case law